Antonios Pepanos (1866 - 1918) was a Greek swimmer. He was a member of Gymnastiki Etaireia Patron, which merged with Panachaikos Gymnastikos Syllogos in 1923 to become Panachaiki Gymnastiki Enosi. He won the silver medal in the 1896 Summer Olympics in Athens.

Before the Olympics, Pepanos was hesitating about taking part because he was already thirty years old and past his prime. Finally, even though he was suffering from a cold on the day of the event, he competed in the 500 metres freestyle. He finished second with a time of 9:57.6. The winner, Austrian Paul Neumann, had finished in 8:12.6.

References

External links

The first version of this article has been based on the text of :el:Αντώνιος Πέπανος of the Greek Wikipedia published under GFDL.
  (Digitally available at )

1866 births
1918 deaths
Greek male swimmers
Olympic silver medalists for Greece
Olympic swimmers of Greece
Swimmers at the 1896 Summer Olympics
19th-century sportsmen
Sportspeople from Patras
Medalists at the 1896 Summer Olympics
Olympic silver medalists in swimming
Date of birth missing
Date of death missing
Place of death missing